The 2012 Rice Owls football team represented Rice University in the 2012 NCAA Division I FBS football season. They were led by sixth year head coach David Bailiff and played their home games at Rice Stadium. They were a member of the West Division of Conference USA. They finished the season 7–6, 4–4 in C-USA play to finish in a tie for third place in the West Division. They were invited to the Armed Forces Bowl where they defeated Air Force.

Schedule

Source: Schedule

Game summaries

UCLA

UCLA's Johnathan Franklin rushed for 214 yards and three touchdowns in this rout. UCLA dominated both in the air, with 303 yards passing compared to 184 yards for Rice, and on the ground, with 343 yards rushing compared to 174 for Rice. This was despite Rice having about  minutes more of possession than UCLA. Franklin's performance was 2 yards short of a career high. Quarterback Brett Hundley took the first snap of the game 72 yards for a touchdown. Rice was led by quarterback Taylor McHargue, who was 17 of 28 in passing for 179 yards and one interception; and had 129 yards rushing. In addition, Rice linebacker Cameron Nwosu set an NCAA record, blocking three PATs in the first half.

1st quarter scoring: UCLA – Brett Hundley 72-yard run (K. Fairbairn kick blocked); UCLA – Jerry Johnson 11-yard pass from Hundley (Fairbairn kick blocked); UCLA - Franklin 74-yard run (Fairbairn kick); RICE – Luke Willson 8-yard pass from T. McHargue (Chris Boswell  kick); RICE - Boswell 53-yard field goal

2nd quarter scoring: RICE - McHargue 1-yard run (Boswell  kick); UCLA – Devin Lucien 27-yard field goal; UCLA - Franklin 78-yard run (Fairbairn kick); RICE – Sam McGuffie 2-yard pass from McHargue (Boswell kick); UCLA – Damien Holmes 44-yard fumble recovery (Fairbairn kick blocked)

4th quarter scoring: UCLA – Joseph Fauria 4-yard pass from Hundley (Hundley pass failed); UCLA - Franklin 22-yard run (David Allen pass from Hundley)

@ Kansas

Last meeting was in the 1961 Bluebonnet Bowl.

@ Louisiana Tech

Marshall

vs Houston

@ Memphis

UTSA

@ Tulsa

Southern Miss

@ Tulane

SMU

@ UTEP

Air Force–Armed Forces Bowl

References

Rice
Rice Owls football seasons
Armed Forces Bowl champion seasons
Rice Owls football